The 1932–33 Challenge Cup was the 33rd staging of rugby league's oldest knockout competition, the Challenge Cup.

First round

Second round

Quarter finals

Semi-finals

Final
Huddersfield beat Warrington 21-17 in the final at Wembley before a crowd of 41,784. This was Huddersfield’s fourth Challenge Cup Final win in as many appearances, and they became the first team to win the trophy more than three times. This was also the fifth Challenge Cup Final defeat for Warrington.

References

Challenge Cup
Challenge Cup